All-Star K!, formerly K! The 1 Million Peso Videoke Challenge, is a Philippine television karaoke game show broadcast by GMA Network. Originally hosted by Arnell Ignacio, it premiered on January 13, 2002. The show concluded on October 18, 2009 with a total of 512 episodes. Jaya and Allan K. served as the final hosts.

Hosts

 Arnell Ignacio 
 Jaya 
 Allan K.

Ratings
According to AGB Nielsen Philippines' Mega Manila household television ratings, the final episode of All Star K! scored a 15.16% rating.

Accolades

References

External links
 

2002 Philippine television series debuts
2009 Philippine television series endings
Filipino-language television shows
GMA Network original programming
Karaoke television series
Musical game shows
Philippine game shows